Division bell refers to Division bell, a bell rung in or around a parliament.  It may also refer to:

 The Division Bell, a studio album by rock group Pink Floyd
 The Division Bell Tour, a 1994 tour by Pink Floyd to support the album